Peter Asplund (born 26 September 1969) is a Swedish jazz trumpeter, singer, and composer. Asplund studied at the Royal College of Music in Stockholm. He has recorded several solo albums and participated as solo artist on records with other artists, such as Lisa Ekdahl, and Viktoria Tolstoy. He earlier performed and toured regularly with Bo Kaspers Orkester.

In 2010, Asplund released an album, Asplund Meets Bernstein, in cooperation with Mats Hålling - a Swedish composer and arranger - and  Dalasinfoniettan - a regional chamber orchestra. In 2014, the Konserthuset, Stockholm - the home for the Royal Stockholm Philharmonic Orchestra - presented a concert (available as a video) with Peter Asplund and the Swedish Chamber Orchestra, led by Mats Hålling.

Awards 
In 2004 and  2010, Asplund was awarded the Gyllene skivan prize for the best jazz album of the year.

Discography

As solo artist 
 1995 - Open Mind (Dragon)
 1999 - Melos (Sittel)
 2000 - Satch as Satch (Sittel)
 2004 - Lochiel's Warning (Prophone)
 2008 - As Knights Concur (Prophone)
 2010 - Asplund Meets Bernstein (Prophone)
 2013 - The Christmas Feeling (Prophone)
 2015 - Aspiration, Home Safe ...and Sound (Prophone)

References

External links 
 Official web site

1969 births
Living people
Swedish jazz trumpeters
Male trumpeters
21st-century trumpeters
21st-century Swedish male musicians
Male jazz musicians